The men's +80 kg  competition in taekwondo at the 2004 Summer Olympics in Athens took place on August 29 at the Faliro Coastal Zone Olympic Complex.

South Korean taekwondo jin and 1999 world champion Moon Dae-sung unleashed a wicked roundhouse kick to knock out two-meter tall fighter and home favorite Alexandros Nikolaidis of Greece from the mat for an Olympic gold just a minute into the bout. Meanwhile, France's Pascal Gentil opened up a four-point gap over Jordan's Ibrahim Kamal, and defeated him 6–2 to repeat his bronze medal victory from Sydney four years earlier.

Competition format
The main bracket consisted of a single elimination tournament, culminating in the gold medal match. The taekwondo fighters eliminated in earlier rounds by the two finalists of the main bracket advanced directly to the repechage tournament. These matches determined the bronze medal winner for the event.

Schedule
All times are Greece Standard Time (UTC+2)

Results
Legend
PTG — Won by points gap
KO — Won by knockout
SUP — Won by superiority
OT — Won on over time (Golden Point)
WO — Walkover

Main bracket

Repechage

References

External links
Official Report

Men's 80 kg
Men's events at the 2004 Summer Olympics